Escadron de Transport 3/60 Estérel is a French Air and Space Force squadron located at Creil Air Base, Oise, France which operates the Airbus A310 and the Airbus A340.

See also

 List of French Air and Space Force aircraft squadrons

References

French Air and Space Force squadrons